The following is a list of National Christian College Athletic Association Men's Basketball champions.

References

National Christian College Athletic Association